Joseph A. Martin (1888 – October 17, 1928) was the mayor of Detroit, Michigan in 1924.

Biography
Joseph A. Martin was born on June 26, 1888.  He was Commissioner of Public Works for Detroit from 1920 to 1923.  He served as acting mayor in 1924 after Frank Ellsworth Doremus resigned for health reasons.  Martin resigned to concentrate on running for mayor, but lost a three-way race to John W. Smith (with Charles Bowles as the write-in candidate).

Joseph A. Martin died on October 17, 1928.

References

External links

1888 births
1928 deaths
Mayors of Detroit
20th-century American politicians